Ballyhoo! is an American reggae rock and punk band from Aberdeen, Maryland. The group has sold over 30,000 copies of its five albums and more than 200,000 digital tracks.

Ballyhoo! played the House of Marley Stage on the Warped Tour of 2012. The band has opened up for bands 311, Dirty Heads, Tribal Seeds, and  Slightly Stoopid on previous tours. The group played over 166 shows in 2012.

History

Ballyhoo! was formed in July 1995 by brothers Howi Spangler (vocals and guitar) and Donald Spangler (drums) with their friend Josh Farley on bass. In 1997, Farley left the band and Cassius King took over on bass.

In 2000, Ballyhoo! released their debut album, 365-Day Weekend around the same time they became a quartet with the addition of Scott Vandrey on keyboard. Next, they released their first EP titled The Green in 2004. Both were released on Hooligan Records.

The band's self-released second album Do It For The Money! in 2006 (produced by Jerome Maffeo) featured their first singles, "Cali Girl" and "Cerveza". After this release, the band switched bassists again; from Cassius King to J.R. Gregory.

The follow-up third album, Cheers!, released in 2009 on Surfdog Records, was produced by Scotch Ralston (311 collaborator). The album also features mix work by 311 drummer, Chad Sexton.

Ballyhoo! released a single, "Front Porch", in October 2010 (produced by Jerome Maffeo).

The band's fourth album Daydreams was the group's first release under Pepper's LAW Records. The 12-track album was recorded and produced at Sound Lounge studios in Orlando, Florida by Greg Shields and Mike Stebe and released in September 2011. The album debuted at #1 on the iTunes Reggae Charts, as well as #4 on Amazon. Their single "Last Night" saw rotation at various alternative radio stations including WHFS Baltimore, WRFF Philadelphia, KUKQ Phoenix, Star 101.9 Honolulu, and SiriusXM's Faction, as well as, various specialty shows around the country. The band's second single "Walk Away" opened even more doors at radio stations with its melodic chorus and sing along vibe. Pepper's drummer Yesod Williams and owner of his band's label LAW Records says of his newest addition, "Having Ballyhoo! join the LAW family is a perfect fit. They are an incredibly talented band with a really catchy style".

By this time, Ballyhoo! was listed on MTV's "Top 100 Bands to Watch" by the Artist on the Verge Project. And even featured two downloadable songs on the popular video game Rock Band.

After heavily touring across the country, Ballyhoo! released a compilation album titled, Medium Rare: A collection of tasty cuts on December 22, 2012. This was a collection of live tracks, unreleased songs and early versions of their favorite songs.

Pineapple Grenade!!, Ballyhoo!'s fifth album was recorded in three weeks in January 2013 and was released on June 25, 2013. This is the first album produced under Right Coast Records, Ballyhoo!'s record label. All songs were produced by Paul Leary (Sublime) and Matt Wallace (Maroon 5, Faith No More). Their first single, "Run" saw much radio play. While their second single "No Good" was produced by Rome Ramirez from Sublime with Rome. The album climbed the Billboard Top 200 album chart at #189, as well as reaching #4 Billboard Heatseekers and #5 at iTunes Alternative charts.

On February 26, 2013, Ballyhoo! released a single, "Marijuana Laws". After both releases, Nick Lucera took over as the band's bassist after J.R. Gregory's departure in 2014.

The same year, the band released The Cool Down, Vol. 1 EP, along with their single "Mixtape", which was later featured on their sixth LP album, Girls. which was released on March 17, 2017 on their label Right Coast Records.

The band's seventh album, Detonate was released on September 28, 2018; again on their own label. Howi Spangler described this album as "the closest I've come to a dairy. These songs are me dealing with the passing of my Dad in 2016 and my Mom in 1996 as a kid, nearly wanting to quit music, the struggle of having a family and being away all the time..."

The band released a two-song singles sample called Sounds of Summer '19 on August 23, 2019, which featured "California King" and "Dark Sunglasses". These two tracks are also on the 4-song EP, Fighter that was released on Valentine's Day. The EP also included the single "Renegade" featuring Red Bowne of Passafire.

The band's latest album, Message to the World was released on June 5, 2020. Top tracks are, "Social Drinker" and "Renegade" featuring Ted Bowne from Passafire, as well as the self-titled single.

On August 21, 2020, the single "I'll Be Ok" was released with Howi Spangler on acoustic guitar. Wanting to "shed light on depression and help people find the resources they need to cope", he explained, "I wrote this song when I was feeling really down one night...Nothing felt right. It was hard to be happy in that moment. So I wrote about it."

In 2021, Ballyhoo! was featured as one of the reggae/punk artists on The House That Bradley Built, a charity compilation honoring Sublime's lead singer Bradley Nowell, helping musicians with substance abuse. They covered Sublime's song "S.T.P." Also, the band was featured on Collie Buddz second riddim album, Cali Roots Riddim 2021 with their single, "The Come Up".

On December 24, 2021, Ballyhoo released their fourth EP titled Planet Sad Boi on Right Coast Records. It's a 4-song EP that features the single "Beachside Baby" and includes a cover of The Eagles song "Please Come Home For Christmas".

Tours and Other Works
Tour highlights include: 311 Pow Wow Festival in 2011, the 311 Caribbean Cruise in 2012 and 2013, The Bamboozle Festival in 2012, the entire Vans Warped Tour in 2012, and the California Roots Music and Arts Festival in 2013.

After releasing Pineapple Grenade, Ballyhoo! co-headlined the Summer Sickness tour in 2013 alongside Authority Zero and special guests Versus the World.

In 2015, Ballyhoo! joined a tour with Reel Big Fish and Less Than Jake.

Ballyhoo! performed the entire Vans Warped Tour in 2016.

In 2018, Ballyhoo! joined a tour with Reel Big Fish once again, this time to promote their new album Detonate.

In 2019, Ballyhoo! joined Rebelution and Collie Buddz on the Good Vibes summer tour.

In 2021, Ballyhoo! got back to touring in the spring with their first tour since the COVID-19 pandemic. It started out on the east coast with Tropidelic and followed by a Summer tour of the mid-west, including Tropidelic's Everwild Festival in Ohio. Starting on September 26, they will be co-headling a Fall tour with The Expendables presenting what they call "The ExpendaHoo! 2021 Tour", which includes opening band, Tunnel Vision. Ballyhoo! even collabored with The Expendables on their 2011 single "Walk Away", creating a remixed version with both Howie Spangler and Geoff Weers on vocals. Ballyhoo also covered The Expendables 2007 song, "Down Down Down".

In popular culture
Ballyhoo!'s music has appeared in numerous surf/skate videos and compilation albums including "Forever Free: A Tribute to Sublime", which featured a cover of "40 Oz. to Freedom". Ballyhoo! songs also appear in the feature films, "Beach Kings" and "Road Trip: Beer Pong".

Lineup

Current members

Howi Spangler – Lead Vocals/Guitar (1995–present)
Donald Spangler – Drums (1995–present)
Scott Vandrey – Keyboards/Programming/Vocal Harmonies (2000–present)
Nick Lucera – Bass (2014–present)

Former members

J.R. Gregory – Bass (2004–2014)
Cassius King (UNKSTA) – Bass (1997–2003)
Josh Farley – Bass (1995–1997)

Timeline

Discography

Studio albums

Extended play (EPs)/Live Albums

Singles

Compilation appearances
Sense Boardwear: Poetry In Motion, Vol. 5 (2008), The Pier Magazine / 2 tracks: ("Dead By Tomorrow", "Scarlet Blue")
Sense Boardwear: Amplified – An Acoustic Collective, Vol. 6 (2010), The Pier Magazine / 2 tracks: ("Love Letters", "Mad Love")

References

External links
 Official Website
 Official Youtube Channel

Musical groups from Baltimore
Musical groups established in 1995
Reggae rock groups
Rock music groups from Maryland